Milton Overton is the current director of athletics for Kennesaw State University. He previously served as athletic director at Florida A&M University from 2015 to 2017, as an associate athletic director at the University of Alabama from 2009 to 2015, and as an associate athletic director at Texas A&M University from 1999 to 2009. Overton attended college at the University of Oklahoma, where he played on the offensive line on the Oklahoma Sooners football team. Overton was named athletic director at Kennesaw State University on October 31, 2017.

References

External links
Kennesaw State bio
Florida A&M bio

Living people
African-American college athletic directors in the United States
Florida A&M Rattlers and Lady Rattlers athletic directors
Kennesaw State Owls athletic directors
Oklahoma Sooners football players
Year of birth missing (living people)
21st-century African-American people